The Immediate Geographic Region of Varginha is one of the 10 immediate geographic regions in the Intermediate Geographic Region of Varginha, one of the 70 immediate geographic regions in the Brazilian state of Minas Gerais and one of the 509 of Brazil, created by the National Institute of Geography and Statistics (IBGE) in 2017.

Municipalities 
It comprises 5 municipalities:

 Cordislândia
 Elói Mendes
 Monsenhor Paulo
 São Gonçalo do Sapucaí
 Varginha

References 

Geography of Minas Gerais